Htree is a version of a B-tree, and indexing structure used in Linux file systems.

Htree may also refer to:

 H tree, a family of fractal sets

See also
 Hilbert R-tree